George Wilmarth "Wiley" Nickel III (born November 23, 1975) is an American attorney and Democratic politician serving as the U.S. representative for North Carolina's 13th congressional district since 2023.

Nickel served as a member of the North Carolina Senate from the 16th district from 2019 to 2023. He was elected to the House of Representatives in 2022.

Early life and education 
Nickel was born and raised in the San Joaquin Valley. After graduating from Francis W. Parker School in Chicago, he earned a Bachelor of Arts degree in political science and government from Tulane University and a Juris Doctor from Pepperdine University School of Law.

Career

Politics
Nickel worked for Vice President Al Gore from 1996 to 2001 as a member of his national advance staff. He is also a member of Gore's Climate Reality Leadership Corps.

Nickel later worked on Barack Obama's 2008 presidential campaign and served on the White House national advance staff from 2008 until 2012. He is a member of the Obama Alumni Association and was part of Obama's first wave of political endorsements in 2018. Obama endorsed six candidates in North Carolina, including Nickel, in August 2018.

2006 State Senate election

Nickel ran in California's 12th State Senate district in 2006 against incumbent Republican Jeff Denham. He was called "a moderate Democrat" and the race was seen as potentially competitive. He spent $250,000 on advertisements, mainly funded by personal loans, with many airing in the Sacramento media market despite the district being in the Modesto region. He lost the general election to Denham, approximately 60%-40%.

Law
Nickel is also a criminal defense attorney, having opened his law practice in Cary in 2011.

North Carolina Senate

Elections

2018 
Nickel was first elected to represent the 16th senate district with over 65% of the vote on November 6, 2018. His seat was one of six seats Democrats picked up to break the Republican supermajority in the North Carolina General Assembly.

2020 
Nickel ran for reelection in 2020. He was unopposed in the Democratic primary and defeated Republican nominee Will Marsh with 65.6% of the vote. He was endorsed by The News & Observer.

Tenure

2019–20 session 
Nickel was appointed to the Agriculture/Environment/Natural Resources Committee, the Pensions/Retirement/Aging Committee and the Education/Higher Education Appropriations Committee on January 18, 2019. He co-sponsored a bill to restore master's degree and doctoral degree pay for teachers in North Carolina.

Nickel co-sponsored Senate Bill 209, which would increase the scope and punishment of hate crimes and require the SBI to maintain and create a hate crimes statistics database. He spoke about SB 209 during a candlelight vigil at the Islamic Center of Cary to remember the New Zealand terror attack victims.

2021–22 session 
Nickel serves on the Redistricting and Elections Committee, the Judiciary Committee, the Pensions/Retirement/Aging Committee, and the Appropriations on General Government/Information Technology Committee in the state senate.

U.S. House of Representatives

Elections

2022 

Nickel ran for Congress in North Carolina's newly drawn 13th congressional district. The district covers southern Wake County, all of Johnston County, and parts of Wayne and Harnett Counties. Nickel won the Democratic nomination.

The Carolina Journal wrote that Nickel ran "as a moderate despite a fairly left-wing voting record".

Nickel was endorsed by The Network for Public Education Fund, the North Carolina Association of Educators, NARAL Pro-Choice America, Communication Workers of America, the North Carolina State AFL-CIO, the National Association of Social Workers, Human Rights Campaign, Everytown for Gun Safety, the League of Conservation Voters, the Voter Protection Project, the Sierra Club, Equality North Carolina, the North Carolina Alliance for Retired Americans, North Carolina Asian Americans Together in Action, and Professional Fire Fighters and Paramedics of North Carolina.

Nickel defeated Bo Hines, the Republican nominee, in the November 8 general election.

Caucus memberships 

 New Democrat Coalition

Committee Assignments 

 House Committee on Financial Services

Political positions

Abortion
Nickel supports abortion rights and codifying Roe v. Wade into federal law.

Nickel voted against a resolution to condemn attacks against crisis pregnancy centers, anti-abortion individuals, and churches.

Gerrymandering
He opposes gerrymandering.

Electoral history

2006

2018

2020

2022

Personal life 
Born in California, Nickel moved to North Carolina in 2009. He lives in Cary with his wife, Caroline, and their two children.

References

External links

 Congressman Wiley Nickel official U.S. House website
Wiley Nickel for Congress campaign website

|-

|-

1975 births
21st-century American politicians
Barack Obama 2008 presidential campaign
Democratic Party members of the United States House of Representatives from North Carolina
Democratic Party North Carolina state senators
Living people
People from Cary, North Carolina
Pepperdine University School of Law alumni
Tulane University alumni